Achziv Islands (also Achziv Beach Islands) are a group of small Israeli islands in the Mediterranean Sea. Each island is a few hundred square meters in area, with a  reef is composed of  small limestone blocks. 

The Achziv islands - Nahlieli, Shahaf and Achziv -  are located west of the Akhziv shore. They are actually the tops of a sunken sandstone ridge. Seagulls and terns nest on Nahlieli. The islands are part of the Rosh HaNikra Islands Nature Reserve.

See also
Geography of Israel

References

Islands of Israel
 Geography of Israel